The 1992–93 FIBA European Cup was the twenty-seventh edition of FIBA's 2nd-tier level European-wide professional club basketball competition.

First round

|}

Second round

|}

*Spartak Subotica was drawn for the competition but was not allowed to compete due to UN embargo on FR Yugoslavia. Dinamo București went through with a walkover.

Third round
Wild card to participate in the European Cup for the Loser clubs* of the 1/16 finals of the 1992–93 FIBA European League.
*Smelt Olimpija, ASK Brocēni, Guildford Kings, Efes Pilsen, USK Praha, CSKA Moscow, Benfica, CSKA Sofia, Hapoel Tel Aviv, Śląsk Wrocław, NMKY Helsinki and Budivelnyk.

|}

Automatically qualified to quarterfinal round
 Slobodna Dalmacija

Quarterfinals round

Semifinals
Seeded teams played games 2 and 3 at home.

|}

Final
March 16, Palazzetto dello sport Parco Ruffini, Turin

|}

References

External links
1992–93 FIBA European Cup @ FIBA Europe.com
1992–93 FIBA European Cup at Linguasport

FIBA
1992-93